Samnis or Samnes may refer to:

 An inhabitant of Samnium, a region of southern Italy conquered by Rome in the 4th century BC
 Samnite (gladiator type), a class of gladiator from the Roman Republican period

See also
 Samnite (disambiguation)